K. is a 1915 crime novel by the American writer Mary Roberts Rinehart (1876–1958) set in post-Victorian era Allegheny, Pennsylvania, which has been a part of the city of Pittsburgh since 1907.

K. is a romance set in the industrial Victorian era. The novel tells the story of Sidney; when Sidney takes in a boarder with the initial "K", her life becomes entwined with the mystery surrounding "K". Lies and intrigue surround Sidney.

A film version of the novel K – The Unknown starring Virginia Valli and Percy Marmont, was released on 17 November 1924 by Universal Pictures as a "Universal Jewel" release. Another film version was released under the title The Doctor and the Woman in 1918.

References

External links
 K. (1915 edition) at the Internet Archive
 K. at Project Gutenberg
 
 Mary Roberts Rinehart Papers, 1831–1970, SC.1958.03, Special Collections Department, University of Pittsburgh

1915 American novels
American crime novels
American novels adapted into films
Houghton Mifflin books
Novels set in Pittsburgh
Works by Mary Roberts Rinehart